Joanna Catherine Going (born July 22, 1963) is an American actress known for the television series Kingdom, House of Cards, Mad Men and the movie Wyatt Earp.

Early life
Going was born in Washington, DC, the eldest of six children of a lawyer/state assemblyman father and a police dispatcher mother. Her father was of Irish descent, and her mother of Italian and French-Canadian.

Career
Going appeared in soap operas in the late 1980s, most notably as Lisa Grady on Another World from 1987 to 1989. She portrayed lead character Victoria Winters in the 1991 primetime series Dark Shadows. She later starred in short-lived television series Going to Extremes and guest-starred on Columbo, Spin City, The Outer Limits and Law & Order.

She starred in a number of feature films. She made her film debut in Wyatt Earp (1994) as Josephine Marcus, and later had major roles in Eden, Keys to Tulsa, Inventing the Abbotts, and Still Breathing. Her biggest role may be in the 1998 film version of Phantoms. In the 2000s, she starred in several television films and guest-starred on CSI: Crime Scene Investigation, Criminal Minds, and Mad Men. She also appeared opposite Sean Penn in the 2011 film The Tree of Life, her first role in a major motion picture since 2003's Runaway Jury. In 2014, she starred as First Lady Tricia Walker in the second season of Netflix political series House of Cards. She was later cast in the DirecTV series Kingdom.

Going was a guest on Ken Reid's TV Guidance Counselor podcast on March 25, 2016.

Personal life
Going married actor Dylan Walsh on October 10, 2004. They have a daughter, Stella Haven. On December 15, 2010, Walsh announced he had filed for divorce; it was finalized in December 2012.

Filmography

Film

Television

References

External links 
 

1963 births
Living people
20th-century American actresses
21st-century American actresses
Actresses from Rhode Island
Actresses from Washington, D.C.
American Academy of Dramatic Arts alumni
American film actresses
American people of French-Canadian descent
American people of Irish descent
American people of Italian descent
American television actresses
Emerson College alumni
People from Newport, Rhode Island